Argand may refer to:

 Aimé Argand (1755 – 1803), Swiss physicist and chemist and inventor of the argand lamp
 Émile Argand (1879 – 1940), Swiss geologist
 Jean-Robert Argand (1768 – 1822), French amateur mathematician
 Argand diagram
 Argand plane

 Luc Argand (1948 - ), Swiss lawyer.